Pediasia steppicolellus is a species of moth in the family Crambidae described by Hans Zerny in 1914. It is found in Uralsk, Russia,

The length of the forewings is 8–9 mm.

References

Moths described in 1914
Crambini
Moths of Europe